Orbital Period is the fifth studio album by Bump of Chicken, released on December 19, 2007. The album features the singles "Planetarium", "Supernova/Karma", "Namida no Furusato", "Hana no Na", and "Mayday". Orbital period became the best-selling album two days in a row at debut, according to Oricon Style. It was the second best-selling album on its debut week.

Track listing

Personnel
Fujiwara Motoo — vocals, guitar
Masukawa Hiroaki — guitar
Naoi Yoshifumi — bass
Masu Hideo — drums

References

External links
orbital period at the official Bump of Chicken website.

2007 albums
Bump of Chicken albums
Japanese-language albums